Roy William Skelton (20 July 1931 – 8 June 2011) was a British actor best known for his voice work as puppet characters Zippy and George in the British children's television series Rainbow and Daleks in Doctor Who. Born in Nottingham to John H Skelton and Dorothy (née Bromley), Skelton trained at the Bristol Old Vic Theatre School and voiced several Doctor Who villains from the 1960s to the 1980s, including the Daleks, Cybermen and the Krotons. He devised the voices of the Cybermen himself, and started performing the Daleks in 1967 (later continuing the role from Peter Hawkins whom he also replaced as Zippy on Rainbow) and notably performed in the Doctor Who specials The Five Doctors and The Curse of Fatal Death. Skelton joined Rainbow in the early 1970s and performed on the series until its cancellation in 1992. Due to the fame of the characters, he continued to voice Zippy and George in guest appearances on television in series such as The Weakest Link, Harry Hill's TV Burp and Ashes to Ashes until his death. He wrote over 150 episodes of Rainbow. 

Skelton died at his home in Brighton, East Sussex, on 8 June 2011, after suffering a stroke less than 2 months before his 80th birthday.

Filmography
Play It Cool (1962) - Mechanic #1 (uncredited)
Night After Night After Night (1969) - Counsel
There's a Girl in My Soup (1970) - Reporter (uncredited)
Frenzy (1972) - CID Man (uncredited)

References

External links

Obituary in The Independent

1931 births
2011 deaths
English male television actors
English male voice actors
Actors from Nottingham